Burgadzhino (Borğatya) is a rural locality (a village) in Alegazovsky Selsoviet, Mechetlinsky District, Bashkortostan, Russia. The population was 249 as of 2010. There are 7 streets.

Geography 
Burgadzhino is located 27 km west of Bolsheustyikinskoye (the district's administrative centre) by road. Melekasovo is the nearest rural locality.

References 

Rural localities in Mechetlinsky District